The 2021 Supercopa de España Final decided the winner of the 2020–21 Supercopa de España, the 37th edition of the annual Spanish football super cup competition. The match was played on 17 January 2021 at the Estadio de La Cartuja in Seville, Spain. The match was a clásico between Barcelona and Athletic Bilbao.

Athletic Bilbao won the match 3–2 after extra time to win their third Supercopa de España title.

Teams

Route to the final

Match

Summary 
Barcelona took the lead in the 40th minute through Antoine Griezmann who finished from a rebound after neat interplay between Lionel Messi and Jordi Alba. Athletic Bilbao replied immediately as Óscar de Marcos scored just two minutes later, assisted by Iñaki Williams, to make it 1–1 going to half time. In the second half, Athletic Bilbao had a goal ruled out for a narrow offside in the 55th minute via VAR after Raúl García's header found the back of the net. Griezmann got his second goal in the 77th minute from another Jordi Alba's cross to give Barcelona the lead again, before substitute Asier Villalibre's 90th-minute equaliser, a volley from an Iker Muniain free kick, forced the game into extra time. Athletic Bilbao started well in the extra period and got their third, match-winning goal in the 93rd minute through a curling drive into the top corner from Williams, who was subsequently named man of the match. Barcelona captain Messi was sent off in the final minutes for striking Villalibre as Barcelona ended the game with 10 players on the pitch.

Details

Notes

References

External links 

2021 Final
Sports competitions in Seville
Supercopa de España Final
2021 in Spanish sport
FC Barcelona matches
Athletic Bilbao matches
21st century in Seville
2021 in Andalusia